Dehak-e Aliabad (also Romanized as Dehak-e ʿAlīābād; also known as Dehak) is a village in Aliabad-e Malek Rural District, in the Central District of Arsanjan County, Fars Province, Iran. At the 2006 census, its population was 206, in 50 families.

References 

Populated places in Arsanjan County